Boughtonville is an unincorporated community in Huron County, in the U.S. state of Ohio.

History
A post office was established at Boughtonville in 1891, and remained in operation until it was discontinued in 1935. The community was named after the local Boughton family.

References

Unincorporated communities in Huron County, Ohio
Unincorporated communities in Ohio